The Duke of Cumberland's Regiment, also known as Montagu's Corps, South Carolina Rangers, and the Loyal American Rangers, was a British Loyalist provincial unit raised from American colonists and rebel prisoners by the former British Royal Governor of the Province of South Carolina, Lord Charles Montagu as well as in the colony of the Province of New York.

American Revolution
Lord Montagu raised 5 companies of 100 men each in Charleston and Camden, South Carolina as well as African slaves for service in Jamaica or elsewhere. Montagu recruited rebel prisoners who agree to fight the Spanish - not their fellow Americans. The regiment was involved in a skirmish. In August 1781, the regiment sailed for Jamaica and spent the war there. The second Battalion and Lord Montagu arrived in New York on 4 April 1783 to recruit for the Battalion. The Duke of Cumberland's Regiment was disbanded in Jamaica on 24 October 1783.

Resettlement in Nova Scotia

Captain Gideon White's company was allowed to settle in Nova Scotia, settling at Shelburne, Nova Scotia.  Sgt. Nathan Pushee settled at Chedabucto (present-day Guysborough), eventually founding present-day Amherst, Nova Scotia.  Montagu died soon after he arrived in Halifax and is buried at St. Paul's Church (Halifax), Nova Scotia.

Notable members 
 Captain Gideon White
 Marcus Rainsford
 Lord Charles Montagu

See also 
Nova Scotia in the American Revolution

References

Links
 Duke of Cumberland Regiment - History

Military history of Nova Scotia
Loyalist military units in the American Revolution